Coiffaitarctia steniptera is a moth of the family Erebidae first described by George Hampson in 1905. It is found in Costa Rica, French Guiana, Suriname and the Amazon region.

References

Phaegopterina
Moths of Central America
Moths of South America
Moths described in 1905